Jo Richards may refer to:

Jo Richards (naval architect) of Laser Pico and other boats
Jo Richards, character in Boogie Woogie (film)
Jo Richards (gymnastics coach) of Allana Slater

See also
Jo-Anne Richards, South African journalist and author
Josephine Richards (disambiguation)
Joe Richards (disambiguation)